The MuchMusic Video Award for Best French Video was presented from 1995 to 2007, to a music video by a French language recording artist from Quebec.

Winners and nominees

References

MuchMusic Video Awards
French-language mass media in Canada